Squash competitions at the 1999 Pan American Games was held from July 23 to August 8 in Winnipeg, Manitoba, Canada.

Men's competition

Singles

Team

Women's competition

Singles

Team

Medal table

References
 Sports 123
 worldsquash
 squashflash

P
1999
Events at the 1999 Pan American Games